St Michael and St Mary's Church, Melbourne is a Grade I listed parish church in the Church of England in Melbourne, Derbyshire.

History

The church is medieval and existed when the Domesday Book was compiled in 1086. The current building dates from the early part of the 12th century when the living of Melbourne was given to the Bishop of Carlisle.

It was restored by Sir George Gilbert Scott between 1859 and 1862. It was closed for one year at the start of the restoration in 1859 and reopened on 3 November 1860, when enough work had been completed to allow the congregation to use the building. The interior was renovated. The aisles were floored with red and white Mansfield stone laid in a diamond pattern. The chancel was laid with Minton encaustic tiles. A new pulpit and reading desk were installed. The wall plaster was removed and the stonework revealed. The west front stonework was renewed.

Parish status

The church is in a joint parish with:
St James' Church, Smisby
St Michael's Church, Stanton by Bridge
St George's Church, Ticknall

Vicars of Melbourne

The names of the Vicars are found in the Episcopal Register of Lichfield, in extracts from the deeds in the Melbourne Hall Muniment Room made by Mr. W.D. Fane and in the Parish Church Registers dating from 1054.

Organ

The church contains a pipe organ by Bevington and Sons dating from the 1860s, subsequently modified by Kingsgate Davidson and Co in 1956 and Nicholson & Co (Worcester) Ltd in 1981. A specification of the organ can be found on the National Pipe Organ Register.

See also
Grade I listed churches in Derbyshire
Grade I listed buildings in Derbyshire
Listed buildings in Melbourne, Derbyshire

References

Church of England church buildings in Derbyshire
Grade I listed churches in Derbyshire
St Michael with St Mary's Church